|}

The Hambleton Stakes is a handicap flat horse race in Great Britain open to horses aged four years or older.
It is run at York over a distance of 7 furlongs and 192 yards, and it is scheduled to take place each year in May. Prior to 2018 it was run as a Listed handicap, but was downgraded by the British Horseracing Authority to comply with a new rule that no handicap race could carry Listed or Group race status.

Winners since 1988

See also 
Horse racing in Great Britain
List of British flat horse races

References

 Paris-Turf:

Racing Post:

Flat races in Great Britain
York Racecourse
Open mile category horse races